the World Three-Cushion Championship is a billiards competition held in the Americas. It was the most prestigious Three-cushion tournament up until the UMB World Three-cushion Championship popularized Three-cushion in Europe. The event was held in United States and from 1928 ran alongside the UMB World Three-cushion Championship, both as World Championship events. By the 1960s popularity for 3-Cushion had declined in the U.S, with Straight Pool being a more popular game, this meant an end for World Three-cushion events in the U.S. Alfredo de Oro is the most successful player having won the tournament on 20 occasions. The oldest player to win the tournament is Willie Hoppe at 64 years old at the time of his victory. The youngest player to win the tournament is Harold Worst at 24 years old at the time of his victory.

History
The first three-cushion billiards tournament took place at Mussey’s Billiard Hall in the United States in 1878. The winner was Leon Magnus, who received a cash prize of $75. However, fans of cue sports were not immediately taken with the new sport of three-cushion billiards. This lack of popularity resulted in a lull in the occurrence of additional tournaments in the United States for several years. In the subsequent decades, the tournament was held only once in 1899 and was won by William Catton.

The popularity of three-cushion billiards increased with the introduction of the Lambert Trophy in 1907. To win this trophy, a player had to defeat others in a knockout-style tournament. Harry Cline was the first winner of the Lambert Trophy. Around this time, less formal tournaments also became popular, especially in the United States. These were designed for both amateur and professional players, with the winner receiving a trophy or cup. Tournaments took place in billiard parlours with proprietors using posters to advertise the tournament events.

Winners
In the 1870s, Wayman McCreery invented the game of three-cushion.
Sanctioned World Championship events

Top performers

 In the event of identical records, players are sorted in alphabetical order by first name.

References